Chankom Municipality (in the Yucatec Maya language: “little ravine”) is one of the 106 municipalities in the Mexican state of Yucatán containing  (137.95 km2) of land and located roughly 135 km southeast of the city of Mérida.

History
Before the arrival of the Spanish, the area was populated as evidenced by archeological sites but no specific information is known of the inhabitants nor the encomienda system. The area was depopulated by the Caste War of Yucatán and the inhabitants did not return to the area until the 1890s.

Chankom was established as a ranchería assigned to the Valladolid region in 1928. Seven years later, it was designated as its own municipality.

Governance
The municipal president is elected for a three-year term. The town council has four councilpersons, who serve as Secretary and councilors of policing, public services and ecology.

Communities
The head of the municipality is Chankom, Yucatán.  There are 17 populated places in the municipality including Chuntabil, Maykab, Muchucuxca, Nictehá, Sacpasil, San Isidro, San Juan, Santa María Koochilá, Santa Rosa, Ticimul, Tomku, Tzukmuc, Xanla, Xbohon, Xcalakdzonot, X-Cocail, Xhuaymil, Xkatún, Xkopeteil, X-Pamba, Xtamech, Xtohil, Yacbchem, and  Yochotún. The significant populations are shown below:

Local festivals
Every year from the 9 to 13 November the town holds a celebration for its patron saint, San Diego.

Tourist attractions
 Cenote Chankom
 Cenote Kochila
 Cenote Muchucuxca
 Cenote Nicte-Ha
 Cenote Santa María
 Archaeological site Cosil 
 Archaeological site Cosil
 Archaeological site Kochilá
 Archaeological site Ticimul
 Archaeological site Xcocail

References

Municipalities of Yucatán